Frank Lupo (January 22, 1955 – February 18, 2021) was an American television writer and producer who created or co-created many successful TV series from the 1970s to the 1990s. In collaboration with Stephen J. Cannell, Lupo created such shows as The A-Team, Renegade, Riptide, Wiseguy and Hunter. He also served as the executive producer for Walker, Texas Ranger during its first full season.

Lupo died of cardiac arrest at his home in Florida on February 18, 2021, at age 66.

Filmography
Sword of Justice (1978)
Battlestar Galactica (1979)
BJ and the Bear (1979–1980)
The Misadventures of Sheriff Lobo (1979–1981)
Galactica 1980 (1980)
Magnum, P.I. (1981)
The Greatest American Hero (1981–1983)
The A-Team (1983–1987) (Co-Creator, with Stephen J. Cannell)
Riptide (1984–1986)  (Co-Creator, with Stephen J. Cannell)
Hunter (1984–1991) (Creator)
Stingray (1987)
Werewolf (1987) (Creator)
Wiseguy (1987–1990) (Co-Creator, with Stephen J. Cannell)
Something Is Out There (1988)
Hardball (1989)
Raven (1992)
Walker: Texas Ranger (1993)
Lawless (1997)
Raven: Return of the Black Dragons (1997)
Adrenaline Run (2000)
Hunter: Return to Justice (2002)
Hunter: Back in Force (2003)
Painkiller Jane (2007)

References

External links
 

1955 births
2021 deaths
American television producers
American television writers
American male television writers